In the mathematical subfield of numerical analysis, a Hermite spline is a spline curve where each polynomial of the spline is in Hermite form.

See also
Cubic Hermite spline
Hermite polynomials
Hermite interpolation

Splines (mathematics)

Interpolation